The Zhaobaogou culture (Chinese: 趙宝溝文化) (5400–4500 BC) was a Neolithic culture in northeast China, found primarily in the Luan River valley in Inner Mongolia and northern Hebei. The culture produced sand-tempered, incised pottery vessels with geometric and zoomorphic designs. The culture also produced stone and clay human figurines.

The type site at Zhaobaogou, excavated in 1986, was discovered in Aohan Banner, Chifeng, Inner Mongolia. The site covers an area of around 90,000 m2.

See also
 List of Neolithic cultures of China
 Hongshan culture
 Xinglongwa culture

Notes

References
 
 
 

History of Inner Mongolia
Neolithic cultures of China
History of Hebei
6th-millennium BC establishments